Shahar (lit. Dawn) is a moshav in south-central Israel. Located about three kilometres west of Kiryat Gat and one kilometre east of Nir Hen, it falls under the jurisdiction of Lakhish Regional Council.

History
The moshav was founded in 1955 as part of the program to populate the area with Jewish refugees from North Africa and Jewish immigrants from India on the lands of the depopulated Palestinian village of al-Faluja. Its name symbolizes the dawn of Zionist settlement in Hevel Lakhish.

The main industry that they developed was growing flowers for export, an enterprise which, despite the harsh desert climate, grew and prospered. One of Shahar's leading businessmen, Eliahu Bezalel, won the Kaplan Prize in 1994 and then the Pravasi Bharatiya Divas (an award for Non-Resident Indians), in recognition of these achievements.

References

Moshavim
Populated places established in 1955
Populated places in Southern District (Israel)
1955 establishments in Israel
Indian-Jewish culture in Israel
North African-Jewish culture in Israel